St. Catherine's Priory may refer to:

St. Catherine's Priory, Ribe, a Dominican priory in Ribe, Denmark
St. Catherine's Priory, Roskilde, a Dominican priory in Roskilde, Denmark
St. Catherine's Priory, Lincoln, a priory in Lincolnshire, England, UK
St Katherine's Priory, a Benedictine priory in Exeter, UK

See also
St. Catherine (disambiguation)
St. Catherine's Church (disambiguation)